Mümtaz Tarhan (1908 – 18 January 1970) was the governor of Istanbul from 29 November 1957 to 11 May 1958.

References 

Mayors of Istanbul
Turkish Football Federation presidents
Istanbul High School alumni
Istanbul University Faculty of Law alumni
1908 births
1970 deaths
Governors of Istanbul